The Louisiana State Penitentiary (known as Angola, and nicknamed the "Alcatraz of the South", "The Angola Plantation" and "The Farm") is a maximum-security prison farm in Louisiana operated by the Louisiana Department of Public Safety & Corrections.  It is named "Angola" after the former slave plantation that occupied this territory. The plantation was named after the country of Angola from which many slaves originated before arriving in Louisiana.

Angola is the largest maximum-security prison in the United States with 6,300 prisoners and 1,800 staff, including corrections officers, janitors, maintenance, and wardens. Due to these large numbers, it has been given the nickname "a gated community". Located in West Feliciana Parish, the prison is set between oxbow lakes on the east side of a bend of the Mississippi River, thus flanked on three sides by water.

The  of land the prison sits on what was known before the American Civil War as the Angola Plantations, a slave plantation, owned by slave trader Isaac Franklin. Death row for men and the state execution chamber for women and men are located at the Angola facility.

History

Before 1835, state inmates were held in a jail in New Orleans. The first Louisiana State Penitentiary, located at the intersection of 6th and Laurel streets in Baton Rouge, was modeled on a prison in Wethersfield, Connecticut. In 1844 the state leased operation of the prison and its prisoners to McHatton Pratt and Company, a private company.

During the American Civil War, Union soldiers occupied the prison in Baton Rouge. In 1869 during the Reconstruction era, Samuel Lawrence James, a former Confederate major, received the military lease to the future prison property along the Mississippi River. He tried to produce cotton with the forced labor of African Americans.

The land that has been developed as Angola Penitentiary was purchased in the 1830s from Francis Rout as four contiguous plantations by Isaac Franklin. He was a planter and slave trader, co-owner of the profitable slave trading firm Franklin and Armfield, of Alexandria, Virginia, and Natchez, Mississippi. After his death in 1846, Franklin's widow, by then known as Adelicia Cheatham, joined these plantations: Panola, Belle View, Killarney, and Angola, when she sold them all in 1880 to Samuel Lawrence James, the former CSA officer. The Angola plantation was named for the country on the west coast of Southern Africa from which many of its slaves had come. It contained a building called the Old Slave Quarters.

Under the convict lease system, Major James ran his vast plantation using convicts leased from the state as his workers. He was responsible for their room and board, and had virtually total authority over them. With the incentive to earn money from prisoners, the state passed laws directed at African Americans, requiring payment of minor fees and fines as punishment for infractions. Cash-poor men in the agricultural economy were forced into jail and convict labor. Such convicts were frequently abused, underfed, and subject to unregulated violence. The state exercised little oversight of conditions. Prisoners were often worked to death under harsh conditions. James died in 1894.

20th century operations
The Louisiana Department of Public Safety & Corrections says that this facility opened as a state prison in 1901.  The state began transferring prison facilities out of the old penitentiary into Angola. The old penitentiary continued to be used as a receiving station, hospital, clothing and shoe factory, and place for executions until it finally closed in 1917.  The history and archaeology of the old penitentiary provide insights into the structures and daily life of inmates at the time.

In September 1928, prisoners Cleveland Owen, Steven J. Beck, and James Heard, took two prison guards hostage and escaped from Camp E armed with .45 Colt automatics. Ten additional prisoners followed them out of the gates. The break was thwarted when the anticipated ferry was not positioned on the river's prison side. A gunfight between guards and prisoners ensued, leaving five prisoners dead. According to contemporary news reports, twenty-six persons were shot.  "Trusty" prisoners who assisted the guards later sought pardons from Governor Huey Long. 

Charles Wolfe and Kip Lornell, authors of The Life and Legend of Leadbelly, said that Angola was "probably as close to slavery as any person could come in 1930." Hardened criminals broke down upon being notified that they were being sent to Angola. White-black racial tensions in the society were expressed at the prison, adding to the violence: each year one in every ten inmates were stabbed. Wolfe and Lornell said that the staff, consisting of 90 people, "ran the prison like it was a private fiefdom."

The two authors said that prisoners were viewed as  the worst of the lowest order". The state did not appropriate many funds for the operation of Angola, and saved money by trying to decrease costs. Much of the remaining money ended up in the operations of other state projects; Wolfe and Lornell said that the re-appropriation of funds occurred "mysteriously".

In 1935, remains of a Native American individual were taken from Angola and were donated to the Louisiana State University Museum of Natural Science.

In 1948, Governor Earl Kemp Long appointed Rollo C. Lawrence, a former mayor of Pineville, as the first Angola superintendent. Long subsequently established the position of warden as one of political patronage. Long appointed distant relatives as wardens of the prison.

In the institution's history, the electric chair, Gruesome Gertie, was stored at Angola. Because West Feliciana Parish did not want to be associated with state executions, for some time the state transported the chair to the parish of conviction of a condemned prisoner before executing him or her.

A former Angola prisoner, William Sadler (also called "Wooden Ear" because of hearing loss he suffered after a prison attack), wrote a series of articles about Angola in the 1940s. Hell on Angola helped bring about prison reform.

In 1952, 31 inmates, in protest of the prison's conditions, cut their Achilles tendons. The protestors were referred to as the Heel String Gang. This caused national news agencies to write exposé stories about conditions at Angola. In its November 22, 1952, issue, Collier's Magazine referred to Angola as "the worst prison in America". In addition, Margaret Dixon, managing editor of the Baton Rouge Morning Advocate for two decades, worked for prison reform, specifically, construction of other facilities to reduce the population at Angola. The new Margaret Dixon Correctional Institution opened in 1976 and was named for her.

On December 5, 1956, five men escaped by digging out of the prison grounds and swimming across the Mississippi River. They were Robert Wallace, 25; Wallace McDonald, 23; Vernon Roy Ingram, 21; Glenn Holiday, 20; and Frank Verbon Gann, 30. The Hope Star newspaper of Arkansas reported that one body (believed to be Wallace) was recovered from the river.

McDonald was captured later in Texas, after returning to the United States from Mexico. McDonald said that two of his fellow escapees drowned, but this was disputed by warden Maurice Sigler. Sigler said that he believed no more than one inmate drowned. His men had found three clear sets of tracks climbing up the river bank.

Gann's family wrote to Sigler on multiple occasions, requesting that he declare the escaped prisoner dead to free up benefits for his children. Although the family never heard again from Gann, Sigler refused to declare him dead, saying that he was likely in Mexico. Gann had been imprisoned in Angola after escaping from the Opelousas Parish Jail on April 29, 1956, where he was serving a relatively minor charge for car theft.

In 1961, female inmates were moved from Angola to the newly opened Louisiana Correctional Institute for Women.

In 1971 the American Bar Association criticized the state of Angola. Linda Ashton of the Associated Press said that the bar association described Angola's conditions as "medieval, squalid and horrifying". In 1972, Elayne Hunt, a reforming director of corrections, was appointed by Governor Edwin Edwards. The U.S. courts in Gates v. Collier ordered Louisiana to clean up Angola once and for all, ordering the end of the Trustee-Officer and Trusty systems.

Efforts to reform and improve conditions at Angola have continued. In 1975 U.S. District Judge Frank Polozola of Baton Rouge, Louisiana, declared conditions at Angola to be in a state of emergency. The state installed Ross Maggio as the warden. Prisoners nicknamed Maggio "the gangster" because he strictly adhered to rules. Ashton said that by most accounts, Maggio improved conditions. Maggio retired in 1984.

In the 1980s Kirksey Nix perpetrated the "Angola Lonely Hearts" scam from within the prison.

On June 21, 1989, US District Judge Polozola declared a new state of emergency at Angola.

In 1993 Angola officers fatally shot 29-year-old escapee Tyrone Brown.

Burl Cain served as the warden from 1995 to March 7, 2016. He was known for numerous improvements and lowering the rate of violence at the prison, but also numerous criminal allegations.

In 1999 six inmates who were serving life sentences for murder took three officers hostage in Camp D. The hostage takers bludgeoned and fatally stabbed 49-year-old Captain David Knapps. Armed officers ended the rebellion by shooting the inmates, killing 26-year-old Joel Durham, and seriously wounding another.

21st century
In 2004 Paul Harris of The Guardian said "Unsurprisingly, Angola has always been famed for brutality, riots, escape and murder."

On August 31, 2008, New Orleans mayor Ray Nagin stated in a press conference that anyone arrested for looting during the evacuation of the city due to Hurricane Gustav would not be housed in the city/parish jail, but instead sent directly to Angola to await trial.

As evidence that the prison had retained its notoriety, Nagin warned:

In 2009, the prison reduced its budget by $12 million by "double bunking" (installing bunk beds to increase the capacity of dormitories), reducing overtime, and replacing officers with security cameras.

In 2012, 1,000 prisoners were transferred to Angola from C. Paul Phelps Correctional Center, which had closed. The state government did not increase the prison's budget, nor did it hire additional employees.

On March 11, 2014, Glenn Ford, a man wrongfully convicted of murder and Louisiana's longest-serving death row prisoner, walked free after a court overturned his conviction a day earlier when petitioned by prosecutors. Ford had spent nearly three decades at the prison, with 26 years in solitary confinement on death row. The state's policy was to house death row prisoners in solitary confinement, but lengthy appeals have created new harsh conditions of extended solitary. Convicts and their defense counsels have challenged such lengthy stays in solitary confinement, which has been shown to be deleterious to both mental and physical health, and has been considered to be "cruel and unusual punishment" under the US Constitution.

In March 2019, seven members of staff at the facility were arrested for rape, smuggling items to inmates, and maintaining personal relationships with prisoners.

In 2020, regarding the COVID-19 pandemic in Louisiana, ProPublica wrote that prisoners alleged that deliberate low testing rates masked an epidemic in the prison.  Prison officials denied the prisoner's allegations.  Prisoners also allege they were treated with over-the-counter medications, and "four of the 12 prisoners who have died in the pandemic...had been denied needed medical help for days because their symptoms were not considered sufficiently serious". ProPublica also wrote that some sick inmates "concealed their symptoms to try to avoid losing their freedom of movement and other privileges" because of extended quarantines.

Management

Angola was designed to be as self-sufficient as possible; it functioned as a miniature community with a canning factory, a dairy, a mail system, a small ranch, repair shops, and a sugar mill. Prisoners raised food staples and cash crops. The self-sufficiency was enacted so taxpayers would spend less money and so politicians such as Governor of Louisiana Huey P. Long would have an improved public image. In the 1930s prisoners worked from dawn until dusk.

As of 2009 there are three levels of solitary confinement. "Extended lockdown" is colloquially known as "Closed Cell Restricted" or "CCR". Until a period before 2009, death row inmates had more privileges than "extended lockdown" inmates, including the privilege of watching television.

"Extended lockdown" was originally intended as a temporary punishment. The next most restrictive level was, in 2009, "Camp J", referring to an inmate housing unit that houses solitary confinement. The most restrictive level is "administrative segregation", colloquially referred to by inmates as the "dungeon" or the "hole".

Location

Louisiana State Penitentiary is in unincorporated West Feliciana Parish, in east central Louisiana. It is located at the base of the Tunica Hills, in a region described by Jenny Lee Rice of Paste as "breathtakingly beautiful".

Angola is about an hour's drive from Baton Rouge, and it is about a two-hour driving distance from New Orleans. The Mississippi River borders the facility on three sides. The prison is in proximity to the Louisiana-Mississippi border.

Charles Wolfe and Kip Lornell, authors of The Life and Legend of Leadbelly, said that in the 1990s the prison remained "far away from public awareness". The prison property is adjacent to the Angola Tract of the Tunica Hills Wildlife Management Area. Due to security reasons regarding Angola, the Tunica Hills WMA's Angola Tract is closed to the general public from March 1 through August 31 every year.

The main entrance is at the terminus of Louisiana Highway 66, a road described by Wolfe and Lornell as "a winding, often muddy state road". The Angola Ferry provides a ferry service between Angola and a point in unincorporated Pointe Coupee Parish. The ferry is open only to employees except during special events, when members of the general public may use it.

Composition

The  prison property occupies a  area. The size of the prison property is larger than the size of Manhattan. Charles Wolfe and Kip Lornell, authors of The Life and Legend of Leadbelly, said that Angola of the 1990s looks "more like a large working plantation than one of the most notorious prisons in the United States." Officers patrol the complex on horseback, as many of the prison acres are devoted to cultivation of crops. By 1999 the prison's primary roads had been paved.

The prison property is surrounded by the Tunica Hills and by the Mississippi River. The perimeter of the property is not fenced, while the individual prisoner dormitory and recreational camps are fenced. Most of the prison buildings are yellow with a red trim.

Inmate-quarters
The state of Louisiana considers Angola to be a multi-security institution. 29% of the prison's beds are designated for maximum security inmates. The inmates live in several housing units scattered across the Angola grounds. By the 1990s air conditioning and heating units had been installed in the inmate housing units.

Most inmates live in dormitories instead of cell blocks. The prison administration states that this is because having "inmates of all ages and with long sentences [to] live this way encourages cooperation and healthy peer relationships."

Main Prison Complex
The Main Prison Complex consists of the East Yard and the West Yard. The East Yard has 16 minimum and medium custody prisoner dormitories and one maximum custody extended lockdown cellblock; the cellblock houses long-term extended-lockdown prisoners, in-transit administrative segregation prisoners, inmates who need mental health attention, and protective-custody inmates.

The West Yard has 16 minimum and medium custody prisoner dormitories, two administrative segregation cellblocks, and the prison treatment center. The treatment center houses geriatric, hospice, and ill in-transit prisoners. As of 1999 the main prison complex houses half of Angola's prisoners.

Dormitories within the main prison include the Ash, Cypress, Hickory, Magnolia, Oak, Pine, Spruce, and Walnut dormitories. The cell blocks are A, B, C, and D. The main prison also houses the local Main Prison administration building, a gymnasium, a kitchen/dining facility, the Angola Vocational School, and the Judge Henry A. Politz Educational building.

Outcamps
Angola also has several outcamps. Camp C includes eight minimum and medium custody dormitories, one cellblock with administrative segregation and working cellblock prisoners, and one extended lockdown cellblock. Camp C includes the Bear and Wolf dormitories and Jaguar and Tiger cellblocks. Camp D has the same features as Camp C, except that it has one working cellblock instead of an extended lockdown cellblock, and its other cellblock does not have working prisoners. Camp D houses the Eagle and Falcon dormitories and the Hawk and Raven cellblocks.

Camp F has four minimum custody dormitories and the "Dog Pen", which houses 11 minimum custody inmates. All of the prisoners housed in Camp F are trustees who mop floors, deliver food to fellow prisoners, and perform other support tasks. Camp F also houses Angola's execution chamber. Camp F has a lake where trustees fish. A prisoner quoted in Self-governance, Normalcy and Control: Inmate-produced Media at the Louisiana State Penitentiary at Angola described Camp F as being "off from the rest of the prison".

The Close Cell Restricted (CCR) unit, an isolation unit located near the Angola main entrance, has 101 isolation cells and 40 trustee beds.  Jimmy LeBlanc, the corrections secretary, said in October 2010 that the State of Louisiana could save about $1.8 million during the remaining nine months of the 2010–2011 fiscal year if it closed CCR and moved prisoners to unused death row cells and possibly some Camp D double bunks. LeBlanc said that the prisoners in isolation would remain isolated.

Camp J was in operation until its 2018 closure. It has four extended lockdown cellblocks, which contain prisoners with disciplinary problems, and one dormitory with minimum and medium custody inmates who provide housekeeping functions for Camp J. Camp J houses the Alligator, Barracuda, Gar, and Shark cellblocks.

Reception center and death row
The Reception Center, the closest prison housing building to the main entrance, acts as a reception center for arriving prisoners. It is located to the right of the main highway, inside the main gate. In addition it contains the death row for male inmates in Louisiana, with 101 extended lockdown cells housing condemned inmates. The death row facility has a central room and multiple tiers. The entrance to each tier includes a locked door and color photographs of the prisoners located in each tier.

Death row includes eight tiers, lettered A to G. Seven tiers have 15 cells each, while one tier has 11 cells. Each hallway has a cell that is used for showering. The death row houses exercise areas with basketball posts. The death row facility was constructed in 2006 and there is no air conditioning or cross ventilation. In addition, the Reception Center has one minimum custody dormitory with inmates who provide housekeeping for the facility.

In June 2013 three prisoners filed a federal lawsuit against the prison in the court in Baton Rouge, alleging that the death row facility does not have adequate measures to prevent overheating. The prisoners said that due to pre-existing medical conditions, the heat may cause health problems. Brian A. Jackson, the district federal judge, ordered collection of temperature data at the Angola death row for three weeks to determine the conditions. During that time, Angola officials blasted outer walls of the prison with water cannons and installed window awnings to attempt to lower temperature data. In response, Jackson said that he was "troubled" by the possibility of manipulating the temperature data.

On Monday August 5, 2013, the federal trial regarding the condition of the death row in high heat started. The following day, Warden Burl Cain apologized for violating the court order regarding data collection. On Wednesday August 7, 2013, closing arguments in the trial ended. In December 2013 U.S. District Judge Brian Jackson ruled that the heat index of the prison was cruel and unusual punishment, and therefore, a cooling system must be installed. By 2014 a court-ordered plan to install a cooling system was underway.

As of May 2019, the issue was close to being resolved after a 6-year long court battle. A settlement has been reached between the death row inmates and the prison. The settlement agreement calls for daily showers for the three Angola inmates of at least 15 minutes; individual ice containers that are timely replenished by prison staff; individual fans; water faucets in their cells; "IcyBreeze" units or so-called "Cajun coolers"; and the diversion of cool air from the death-row guard pod into their cells. Even though these measures have already been put in place, the court ruling could take until November 2019 to be made final by judge Brian Jackson.

B-Line

The facility includes a group of houses, called the "B-Line", which function as residences for prison staff members and their families; inmates perform services for the staff members and their households. The employee housing includes recreational centers, pools, and parks. The Angola B-Line Chapel was dedicated on Friday, July 17, 2009, at 4:00 pm.

Residents on the prison grounds are zoned to West Feliciana Parish Public Schools. Primary schools serving the Angola grounds include Bains Lower Elementary School and Bains Elementary School in Bains. Secondary schools serving the Angola grounds are West Feliciana Middle School and West Feliciana High School in Bains. The West Feliciana Parish Library is located in St. Francisville. The library, previously a part of the Audubon Regional Library System, became independent in January 2004. West Feliciana Parish is in the service area of Baton Rouge Community College.

Previously elementary school children attended Tunica Elementary School in Tunica, located in proximity to Angola. The school building,  from Angola, is several miles from Angola's main entrance, and many of its students lived on the Angola grounds. On May 18, 2011, due to budget cuts, the parish school board voted to close Tunica Elementary.

Fire station
The fire station houses the Angola Emergency Medical Services Department staff, who provide fire and emergency services to the prison. The Angola Fire Department is registered as department number 63001 with the Louisiana Fire Marshal's Office. The department's equipment includes one engine, one tanker, and one rescue truck. Within Angola the department protects 500 buildings, including employee and prisoner housing quarters. The department has mutual aid agreements with West Feliciana Parish and with Wilkinson County, Mississippi.

Religious sites

The main entrance to Angola has an etched monument that refers to Epistle to the Philippians 3:15.

Reflecting the historic dominance of the Catholic church in south Louisiana, St. Augustine Church was built in the early 1950s and is staffed by the Roman Catholic Church. The New Life Interfaith Chapel was dedicated in 1982.

In the 2000s the main prison church, the churches for Camps C and D, and a grounds chapel were constructed as part of an effort to build chapels for every state-run prison facility. A staff and family of staff chapel was also under construction. Outside donations and ticket sales from the prison rodeo funded these churches. The Camp C Chapel and the B-Line Chapel were both dedicated the same day.

The most recent structure is Our Lady of Guadalupe Chapel, a  structure built with over $450,000 worth of materials donated by Latin American businessmen Jorge Valdez and Fernando Garcia. Its design resembles The Alamo in San Antonio, Texas. Built in 38 days by 50 prisoners, it opened in December 2013. The interfaith church "includes seating for more than 200 and features paintings, furniture and stained-glass windows crafted by inmates."

Recreational facilities

Prison staff members have access to recreational facilities on the Angola property. Angola has ball fields, the Prison View Golf Course, a swimming pool, a tennis court, and a walking track. Lake Killarney, an oxbow lake of the Mississippi River located on the prison grounds, has large crappie fish. The prison administration controls access to Lake Killarney, and few people fish there. The crappie fish grow very large.

Butler Park is a recreational facility on the edge of the Angola property. It houses gazebos, picnic tables, and barbecue pits. As of 1986, a prisoner who has no major disciplinary issues for at least a year may use the property.

Prison View Golf Course
Prison View, the only golf course on the property of an American prison, is between the Tunica Hills and Camp J, at the intersection of B-Line Road and Camp J Road. All individuals wishing to play are required to provide personal information 48 hours before their arrival, so the prison authorities can conduct background checks. Convicted felons and individuals on visitation lists are not permitted to play on the golf course. Current prisoners at Angola are not permitted to play on the golf course.

The golf course, constructed on the site of a former bull pasture, opened in June 2004. Prisoners performed most of the work to construct the course. Prisoners that the administration considers to be the most trustworthy are permitted to work at the golf course.  Warden Burl Cain stated that he built the course so that employees would be encouraged to stay at Angola over weekends. He wanted them available to provide support in case of an emergency.

Guest house
The "Ranch House" is a facility for prison guests. James Ridgeway of Mother Jones described it as "a sort of clubhouse where the wardens and other officials get together in a convivial atmosphere for chow prepared by inmate cooks." Originally constructed to serve as a conference center to supplement the meeting room in the Angola administration building, the "Ranch House" received its name after Burl Cain was selected as Warden. Cain had the building renovated to accommodate overnight guests. The renovations, which included the conversion of one room into a bedroom and the addition of a shower and fireplace, cost approximately $7,346. Traditionally, prisoners who worked successfully as cooks in the Ranch House were later assigned to work as cooks at the Louisiana Governor's Mansion.

Cemeteries

Point Lookout Cemetery is the prison cemetery, located on the north side of the Angola property, at the base of the Tunica Hills. Deceased prisoners from all state prisons had been buried here who were not claimed and transported elsewhere by family members. A white rail fence surrounds the cemetery. The current Point Lookout was created after a 1927 flood destroyed the previous cemetery, which was located between the current Camps C and D. In September 2001 a memorial was installed here that is dedicated to "Unknown Prisoners". The Point Lookout plot established after 1927 has 331 grave markers and an unknown number of bodies; it is considered full.

As of 2010, 90 prisoners were buried at Point Lookout II.

Angola Museum
The Angola Museum, operated by the nonprofit Louisiana State Penitentiary Museum Foundation, is the on-site prison museum. Visitors are charged $5 per adult admission fee, $3 per adult if the group is 10 or larger. The museum is located outside the prison's main gate, in a former bank building.

Angola Airstrip
The prison includes the Angola Airstrip . The airstrip is used by state-owned aircraft to transport prisoners to and from Angola and for transporting officials on state business to and from Angola. The airport is used during daylight and visual flight rules times.

Other prison facilities and features

The facility's main entrance has a metal-roofed guard house for review of traffic to and from the prison. Michael L. Varnado and Daniel P. Smith of Victims of Dead Man Walking said that the guard house "looks like a large carport over the road. " The guard house has long barriers, with Stop signs, to prevent automobiles entering and leaving the compound without the permission of the officers. To allow a vehicle access or egress, the officers manually raise the barriers.

The Front Gate Visiting Processing Center, with a rated capacity of 272 persons, is the processing and security screening point for prison visitors. The United States Postal Service operates the Angola Post Office on the prison grounds. It was established on October 2, 1887.

The David C. Knapps Correctional Officer Training Academy, the state training center for correctional officers, is located at the northwest corner of Angola, in front of Camp F. Near the training center, Angola prisoners maintain the only nature preserve located on the grounds of a penal institution. The R. E. Barrow, Jr., Treatment Center is located on the Angola premises.

The C.C. Dixon K-9 Training Center is the dog-training area. It was named in 2002 to commemorate Connie Conrad Dixon, a dog trainer and K-9 officer, who died in 1997 aged 89.

The Louisiana State Penitentiary Wastewater Treatment Plant serves the prison complex. The prison also houses an all-purpose arena.

History of infrastructure at the prison

Camp A, the former slave quarters for the plantation, was the first building to house inmates. In the early 21st century, Camp A did not house prisoners.

Charles Wolfe and Kip Lornell, authors of The Life and Legend of Leadbelly (1992), said that during the 1930s, Angola was "even further removed from decent civilization" than it was in the 1990s. The two added "that's the way the state of Louisiana wanted it, for Angola held some of the meanest inmates."

In 1930 about 130 women, most of them black, were imprisoned in Camp D. In 1930 Camp A, which held around 700 black inmates, was close to the center of the Angola institution. Inmates worked on levee control, as the springtime high water posed a threat to Angola. Many inmates who tried to swim across drowned; few of their bodies were recovered.

The prison hospital opened in the 1940s. The campus had only one permanent nurse and no permanent doctor.

In the 1980s the main road to Angola had not been paved. It has since been black topped.

The outcamp buildings, constructed in 1939 as a WPA project during the Great Depression, were renovated in the 1970s. During May 1993 the buildings' fire safety violations were reported. In June of that year, Richard Stalder, the Secretary of Corrections, said that Angola would close the buildings if LDP S&C did not find millions of dollars to improve the buildings.

Red Hat Cell Block

The most restrictive inmate housing unit was colloquially referred to as "Red Hat Cell Block", after the red paint-coated straw hats that its occupants wore when they worked in the fields. "Red Hat", a one-story, 30-cell building at Camp E, was built in 1933. Brooke Shelby Biggs of Mother Jones reported that men who had lived in "Red Hat" "told of a dungeon crawling with rats, where dinner was served in stinking buckets splashed onto the floors."

Warden C. Murray Henderson phased out solitary confinement at "Red Hat". In 1972 his successor Elayn Hunt had "Red Hat" officially closed.

In 1977 the administration made Camp J the most restrictive housing unit in Angola. On February 20, 2003, the National Park Service listed the Red Hat Cell Block on the National Register of Historic Places as #03000041.

Demographics
Louisiana State Penitentiary is the largest correctional facility in the United States by population. In 2010 the prison had 5,100 inmates and 1,700 employees. In 2010, the racial composition of the inmates was 76% black, 24% white. 71% of inmates were serving a life sentence. 1.6% had been sentenced to death. As of 2016 many inmates come from the state of Mississippi.

As of 2011 the prison has about 1,600 employees, making it one of the largest employers in the State of Louisiana. Over 600 "free people" live on prison property. These residents are Angola's emergency response personnel and their dependents. In 1986 around 200 families of employees lived within Angola property. Hilton Butler, then Angola's Warden, estimated that 250 children lived on the Angola property.

Many prison employees are from families that have lived and worked at Angola for generations. Laura Sullivan of National Public Radio said "In a place so remote, it's hard to know what's nepotism. There's simply no one else to hire."

Operations

As of 2011 the annual budget of the Louisiana State Penitentiary was more than $120 million. Angola is still operated as a working farm; former Warden Burl Cain once said that the key to running a peaceful maximum security prison was that "you've got to keep the inmates working all day so they're tired at night." In 2009 James Ridgeway of Mother Jones said Angola was "An 18,000-acre complex that still resembles the slave plantation it once was."

Angola has the largest number of inmates on life sentences in the United States. As of 2009 Angola had 3,712 inmates on life sentences, making up 74% of the population that year. Some 32 inmates die each year; only four generally gain parole each year. Louisiana's tough sentencing laws result in long sentences for the inmate population, who have been convicted of armed robbery, murder, and rape. In 1998 Peter Applebome of The New York Times wrote, "It's impossible to visit the place and not feel that a prisoner could disappear off the face of the earth and no one would ever know or care."

Most new prisoners begin working in the cotton fields. A prisoner may spend years working there before gaining a better job.

In Angola parlance a "freeman" is a correctional officer. Around 2000, the officers were among the lowest-paid in the United States. Like the prisoners they supervised, few had graduated from high school. As of 2009, about half of the officers were female.

The administration uses prisoners to provide cleaning and general maintenance services for the West Feliciana Parish School Board and other government agencies and nonprofit groups within West Feliciana Parish.

Warden Burl Cain maintained an open-door policy with the media. He allowed the filming of the documentary The Farm: Angola, USA (1998) at the prison, which focused on the lives of six men. It won numerous awards. Films such as Dead Man Walking, Monster's Ball, and I Love You Phillip Morris were partly filmed in Angola. Cain did not allow a proposed sex scene between two male inmates in I Love You Phillip Morris to be filmed at the prison.

The prison hosts a rodeo every April and October. Inmates produce the newsmagazine The Angolite, which has won numerous awards. It is available to the general public and is relatively uncensored.

The museum features among its exhibits Louisiana's old electric chair, "Gruesome Gertie", last used for the execution of Andrew Lee Jones on July 22, 1991. Angola Prison hosts the country's only inmate-operated radio station, KLSP.

Farming

Inmates cultivate, harvest and process an array of crops that make the facility self-supporting. Crops include cabbage, corn, cotton, strawberries, okra, onions, peppers, soybeans, squash, tomatoes, and wheat. In 2013, the prison resumed growing sugarcane, a practice which it had stopped in the 1970s.

As of 2010 the prison has 2,000 head of cattle. Much of the herd is sold at markets for beef. Each year, the prison produces four million pounds of vegetable crops.

Inmates also breed and train the horses used at Angola for field work. Trustees are mounted to supervise workers in the fields. In 2010, the Angola Prison Horse Sale was initiated at the time of the annual rodeos.

Inmate education
Angola offers literacy classes for prisoners with no high school diploma and no General Equivalency Diploma (GED), from Monday through Friday in the main prison, and in camps C-D and F. Angola also offers GED classes in the main prison and in camps C-D and F. The prison also offers ABE (Adult Basic Education) classes for prisoners who have high school diplomas or GEDs, but who have inadequate Test of Adult Basic Education (TABE) scores to get into vocational school. SSD (Special School District #1) provides services for special education students.

Prisoners with satisfactory TABE scores may be admitted to vocational classes. Such classes include automotive technology, carpentry, culinary arts, graphic communications, horticulture, and welding. In the 1990s, Angola partnered with the New Orleans Baptist Theological Seminary to offer prisoners the chance to earn accredited bachelor's degrees in Ministry. Bruce M. Sabin wrote his doctoral dissertation evaluating the moral development among those college students.

In 1994 the United States Congress voted to eliminate prisoner eligibility for Pell Grants, making religious programs such as the New Orleans Baptist program the only ones in higher education available to prisoners. As of Spring 2008 95 prisoners were students in the program.  Angola also offers the PREP Pre-Release Exit Program and Re-Entry Programs for prisoners who are about to be released into the outside world.

Inmate library services are provided by the main Prison Library and four outcamp libraries. The prison is part of the Inter-Library Loan Program with the State Library of Louisiana.

Manufacturing
Angola has several manufacturing facilities. The Farm Warehouse (914) is the point of distribution of agricultural supplies. The Mattress/Broom/Mop shop makes mattresses and cleaning tools. The Printing Shop prints documents, forms, and other printed materials. The Range Herd group manages 1,600 head of cattle. The Row Crops group harvests crops. The Silk-Screen group produces plates, badges, road and highway signs, and textiles; it also manages sales of sign hardware. The Tag Plant produces license plates for Louisiana and for overseas customers. The Tractor Repair shop repairs agricultural equipment. The Transportation Division delivers goods manufactured by the Prison Enterprises Division.

Magazine
 	

	 	
The Angolite is the inmate-published and -edited magazine of the institution, which began in 1975 or 1976. Each year, six issues are published. Louisiana prison officials believed that an independently edited publication would help the prison. The Angolite gained a national reputation as a quality magazine and won international awards under two prisoner editors, Wilbert Rideau and Billy Sinclair, who became co-editors in 1978. Associate editor Ron Gene Wikberg joined them in 1988, moving up from a position as staff writer. He worked on the magazine until gaining parole in 1992.

Radio
Angola is the only penitentiary in the U.S. to be issued an FCC license to operate a radio station. KLSP (Louisiana State Penitentiary) is a 100-watt radio station that operates at 91.7 on the FM dial from inside the prison to approximately 6,000 potential listeners including inmates and penitentiary staff. The station is operated by inmates and carries some satellite programming. Inside the walls of Angola, KLSP is called the "Incarceration Station" The station airs a variety of programming including gospel, jazz, blues, rock-n-roll, country, and oldies music, as well as educational and religious programs. The station has 20 hours of daily airtime, and all of the music aired by the station is donated. Music from His Radio and the Moody Ministry Broadcasting Network (MBN) airs during several hours of the day. Prisoners make the majority of broadcasting decisions.

A radio station was established in 1986 originally as a means of communication within the complex. Jenny Lee Rice of Paste said "the need to disseminate information rapidly is critical" because Angola is the largest prison in the United States. The non-emergency uses of the station began in 1987 when Jimmy Swaggart, an evangelist, gave the prison old equipment from his radio network. In the early years, the radio station emphasized announcements and music more than religion, but in the early 21st century, it broadcast more religious programming.

In 2001 Christian music artist, Larry Howard of Chuck Colson's Prison Fellowship visited the prison. He encouraged Jim Campbell, the President of  Radio Training Network, to rebuild the station, which was off the air due to antiquated and broken equipment. Campbell and RTN sent HIS Radio Network Operations Manager, Ken Mayfield to head the team to rebuild the station. The team included Ted McCall (HIS Radio Chief Engineer), Jerry Williams (The Joy FM), Ben Birdsong (The Wind FM) Steve Swanson (WAFJ) and Rob Dempsey (HIS Radio). The team conducted an on-air radio fundraiser to buy new radio equipment. The fundraiser exceeded its $80,000 goal, raising more than $124,000 within three hours. Warden Burl Cain used the funds to update the radio equipment. Ken Mayfield returned several times to Angola to train prisoner DJs in using the new electronic systems. New equipment, including a new transmitter, allowed KLSP to broadcast in stereo for the first time, utilize satellite to expand its daily airtime to 20 hours, and to upgrade its programming. As of 2012, KLSP had an output of 105 watts. At  listeners can hear only white noise. Paul von Zielbauer of The New York Times said that "Still, 100 watts does not push the station's signal far beyond the prison gate." All 24 hours are devoted to religious programming. After religion became the primary focus, some inmates stopped listening to the station.

Television
The prison officials have started LSP-TV, a television station. According to Kalen Mary Ann Churcher of Pennsylvania State University, the television station follows the religious programming emphasis of the radio station more closely than it emulates reporting of The Angolite. But its prisoner staff and technicicans also films prisoner events, such as the Angola Prison Rodeo, prize fights, and football games. As it has a closed circuit system, it allows even inmates on death row to watch the broadcasts.

Burial of the deceased
Coffins for deceased prisoners are manufactured by inmates on the prison grounds. Previously, deceased prisoners were buried in cardboard boxes. After one body fell through the bottom of a box, Warden Burl Cain changed a policy, allowing for the manufacture of proper coffins for the deceased.

Death row
In 1972, in the US Supreme Court decision in Furman v. Georgia, the court found application of the death penalty so arbitrary under existing state laws that it was unconstitutional. It suspended executions for all persons on death row in the United States (slightly more than 600, overwhelmingly male) under current state laws in the United States, and ordered state courts to judicially amend their sentences to the next lower level of severity, generally life in prison. Louisiana passed a new death penalty statute, which was overturned by the state supreme court in 1977 for its application to convictions for rape.  The death penalty statute was amended again, effective September 1977. Louisiana did not execute any prisoners until 1983.

According to Louisiana Department of Corrections policy, inmates on death row are held in solitary confinement during the entire time they are incarcerated, even if appeals take years.  This means that they are severely isolated and confined to their windowless cells for 23 hours per day. For one hour per day an inmate may take a shower and/or move up and down the halls under escort. Three times a week an inmate is permitted to use the exercise yard. Death row inmates are allowed to have several books at a time, and each inmate may have one five-minute personal telephone call per month. They may not participate in education or work programs. Death row inmates receive unlimited visitor access. Officers patrol the death row corridors nightly as a suicide prevention tactic.

Nick Trenticosta, a New Orleans attorney with the ACLU who is involved with prison issues, has said that warden Burl Cain treated death row inmates in a more favorable manner than did wardens of other death row prisons in the United States. Trenticosta said, "It is not that these guys had super privileges. But Warden Cain was somewhat responsive to not only prisoners, but to their families."

In March 2017, three death row inmates at Angola filed a federal class-action suit against the prison and LDOC over its solitary confinement policy, charging that it constituted "cruel and unusual punishment" under the 8th Amendment to the US Constitution. Each of the men had been held in solitary for more than 25 years. The lawsuit describes basic conditions on death row:
 sparse cells, hot in summer, with little natural light
 lack of recreation
 no hobbies
 very little religion

This lawsuit was settled in October 2021, requiring that inmates on death row are granted a minimum of four hours out of their cells to congregate with other incarcerated people in their tier each day, at least five hours of communal outdoor recreation each week, the ability to worship together, evening time out of their cells on their tier, at least one meal with other prisoners per day, group classes and contact visitations.

Execution
Male death row inmates are moved from the Reception Center to a cell near the execution chamber in Camp F on the day of the execution. The only person informed of the exact time when a prisoner will be transferred is the Warden; this is for security reasons and so as to not disrupt prison routine. On a scheduled execution date, an execution can occur between 6 p.m. and midnight. Michael L. Varnado and Daniel P. Smith of Victims of Dead Man Walking said that, on many occasions, the rest of Angola is not aware of the execution being carried out. In 2003 Assistant Warden of the Reception Center Lee, said that once death row inmates learn of the execution, they "get a little quieter" and "[i]t suddenly becomes more real to them."

When the State of Louisiana used electrocution as its method of capital punishment, it formally referred to the anonymous executioner as "The Electrician". When the State of Louisiana referred to the executioner by name, he was called "Sam Jones", after Sam H. Jones, the Governor of Louisiana in power when electrocution was introduced as the capital punishment.

Inmate life

Musical culture
, several Angola inmates practiced musical skills. The prison administration encourages prisoners to practice music and uses music as a reward for inmates who behave.

In the 1930s John Lomax, a folklorist, and Alan Lomax, his son, traveled throughout the U.S. South to document African-American musical culture. Since prison farms, including Angola, were isolated from general society, the Lomaxes believed that prisons had the purest African-American song culture, as it was not influenced by popular trends. The Lomaxes recorded several songs, which were plantation-era songs that originated during the slavery era. The Lomaxes met Lead Belly, a famous musician, in Angola. Swamp blues musician Lightnin' Slim also served time in Angola for manslaughter in the 1930s and early 1940s.

From 1968 to 1970, WAFB-TV in Baton Rouge aired a weekly early-morning program, Good Morning, Angola Style, featuring bands made up of Angola inmates. The show was hosted by Buckskin Bill Black, who developed idea for the program after meeting one of the prison's country music bands, The Westernaires, after performing at the 1967 Angola Prison Rodeo.

Sexual slavery
A 2010 memoir by Wilbert Rideau, an inmate at Angola from 1961 through 2005, states that "slavery was commonplace in Angola with perhaps a quarter of the population in bondage" throughout the 1960s and early 1970s. The New York Times states that weak inmates served as sex slaves who were raped, gang-raped, and traded and sold like cattle. Rideau said that "The slave's only way out was to commit suicide, escape or kill his master." Herman Wallace and Albert Woodfox, members of the Angola 3, arrived at Angola in the late 1960s. They became active members of the prison's chapter of the Black Panther Party, where they organized petitions and hunger strikes to protest conditions at the prison and helped new inmates protect themselves from rape and enslavement. C. Murray Henderson, one of the wardens brought in to clean up the prison, states in one of his memoirs that the systemic sexual slavery was sanctioned and facilitated by the officers.

Inmate mental health

Mental health and faith at Angola 
Louisiana State Penitentiary has been known for their non-traditional mental health interventions. One such initiative is a faith-based prototype program for mental healthcare and inmate rehabilitation known as the Angola Prison Seminary. This model focuses on introducing inmates to faith and helping them to find value and purpose through it – be that internally or externally through serving as an Inmate Minister. Through this position, inmates are trained to offer counseling to other inmates, deliver sermons at religious services, officiate funerals for fellow prisoners, and deliver care packages to ill inmates. This model proved to be particularly effective in Louisiana State Penitentiary, especially with its "sidewalk counseling" component. In this type of guidance, the counseling inmate asks leading questions and helps to guide the other inmate to answering their own question, without revealing any type of positionality. This model positively impacted both the counselor and the advisee, as the counselor felt an increased sense of self-worth by helping someone else, and the advisee felt heard and seen, maybe for the first time in his life. The New York Times reported that this program can help inmates feel "at peace with themselves and their lives". Reports noted that the Bible College behind bars made the prison feel significantly more relaxed than it truly was.

Faith is referenced many times as being a catalyst for positive change in the lives of lots of Louisiana State Penitentiary inmates. Author Mark Baker describes this connection in his book entitled You Can Change: Stories from Angola Prison and the Psychology of Personal Transformation. Here, Baker discusses how the high rates of reincarceration among Louisiana State Penitentiary inmates serves as an extremely demoralizing and discouraging reminder of the historical and systemic factors that landed them behind bars in the first place. Given the highly religious background of many of the inmates, who come largely from Louisiana, Mississippi, and other southern states, faith has proven to be a very strong motivator for many of the inmates in Angola. Baker discusses how inmates exposed to religious practices while incarcerated often went on to find a higher purpose in themselves and better avoid future reincarceration.

This faith-based approach to mental healthcare is also seen in palliative care at the Louisiana State Penitentiary. Due to the largely older population of inmates at Louisiana State Penitentiary, the prison sees much higher rates of intakes than release as many men pass away while incarcerated. In partnership with the University Hospital Community Hospice program based out of New Orleans, the Louisiana State Penitentiary has introduced a hospice program for terminally ill inmates. Inmate Ministers are able to assist in counseling with the ill inmates, as well as help them practice faith if they are interested in doing so. As seen with the other responsibilities they were assigned, this serious duty proved beneficial to not only the recipients, but the Inmate Ministers as well.

Though the blend of mental healthcare and faith interventions has been controversial and yielded mixed results in many spaces, research like Baker's suggests that it is working positively in Louisiana State Penitentiary. Though it is unclear why, the large role of religion, particularly Christianity, in the Southern United States, could be a major factor in this occurrence.

Violations of inmate rights 
In 2021, a federal judge found that the Louisiana State Penitentiary violated the Americans with Disabilities Act through its treatment of inmates requiring rehabilitative services. The judge, Chief U.S, District Judge Shelly D. Dick, ultimately ruled that the Louisiana State Penitentiary had committed a violation of the Americans with Disabilities Act, and concluded her opinion by describing fifteen areas in which the prison was in need of injunctive relief.

Inmate organizations 
Inmate organizations include Angola Men of Integrity, the Lifers Organization, the Angola Drama Club, the Wonders of Joy, the Camp C Concept Club, and the Latin American Cultural Brotherhood. Angola is also the only penitentiary in the United States where inmates are allowed to independently run their own churches, a practice founded in the penitentiary's history with slavery, and one looked upon favorably by inmates.

Angola Rodeo

On one weekend in April and on every Sunday in October, Angola holds the Angola Prison Rodeo. On each occasion, thousands of visitors enter the prison complex. Initiated with planning in 1964, the rodeo held its first events in 1965. Initially it was held for prisoner recreation, but attracted increasing crowds.

The prison charges admission. Due to the rodeo's popularity, Angola built a 10,000-person stadium to support visitors; it opened in 2000. As part of the prison rodeo, the prison holds a semiannual Arts and Crafts Festival. In 2010 it started the Angola Prison Horse Sale, also at the time of the rodeo.

Programs for fathers
Angola has two programs for fathers who are incarcerated at Angola. Returning Hearts is an event where prisoners may spend up to eight hours with their children in a Carnival-like celebration. Returning began in 2005; by 2010 a total of 2,500 prisoners had participated in the program. Malachi Dads is a year-long program that uses the Christian Bible as the basis of teaching how to improve a prisoner's parenting skills. Malachi began in 2007; as of 2010 it had 119 men participating. It is based on Malachi 4:6,
"He will turn the hearts of the fathers to the children, and the hearts of the children to their fathers ..."

Notable inmates

Death row and non-death row
 Nathaniel Code
 Antoinette Frank
 Derrick Todd Lee
 Wilbert Rideau
 Billy Sinclair
 Gary Tyler

Executed
 Gerald James Bordelon – Executed in 2010 (last execution in Louisiana)
 John A. Brown, Jr. – Executed in 1997
 Jimmy L. Glass – Executed in 1987
 Antonio G. James – Executed in 1996
 Andrew Lee Jones – Executed in 1991 (last execution via electric chair in Louisiana)
 Leslie Lowenfield – Executed in 1998
 Leslie Dale Martin – Executed in 2002 (last involuntary execution in Louisiana)
 Dalton Prejean – Executed in 1990
 Robert Wayne Sawyer – Executed in 1993 (first execution via lethal injection in Louisiana)
 Elmo Patrick Sonnier – Executed in 1984
 Feltus Taylor, Jr. – Executed in 2000
 Thomas Lee Ward – Executed in 1995
 Dobie Gillis Williams – Executed in 1999
 Robert Wayne Williams – Executed in 1983 (first execution since 1976 in Louisiana)
 Robert Lee Willie – Executed in 1984
 Jimmy C. Wingo – Executed in 1987

Non-death row
 Frank Lee Morris
 C-Murder
 Angola 3 (Robert Hillary King, Herman Wallace, and Albert Woodfox)
 James Booker
 Lil Boosie
 Jack Favor, rodeo performer and manager framed for two murders in 1964 in Bossier Parish; he was convicted and imprisoned from 1967 until his release after acquittal in a second trial in 1974. He helped initiate the Angola Prison Rodeo and make it a major event
 Sean Vincent Gillis
 Patrick O'Neal Kennedy (defendant in Kennedy v. Louisiana)
 Huddie William Ledbetter (Lead Belly) – Camp A, folk and blues musician
 Carlos Marcello, organized crime figure
 H. Lane Mitchell, Shreveport public works commissioner from 1934 to 1968; imprisoned after 1971 for theft of municipal properties valued at nearly $85,000
 Kirksey Nix
 Marlowe Parker (artist)
 Robert Pete Williams
 Clifford Etienne
 Ronald Dominique
 Vincent Simmons
 Charles Neville (musician)
 Freddy Fender, Tejano country and rock-and-roll musician
 Henry Montgomery
 Will Hayden, reality TV host and gunsmith
 Clementine Barnabet, early 20th century voodoo priestess and axe murderer.

Notable employees
Burl Cain (Warden 1995–2015)
Billy Cannon (dentist)
John Whitley (former Warden 1990–1995)
George Gray (former prison guard)

Cultural references

Musical references

The prison has held many musicians and been the subject of a number of songs. Folk singer Lead Belly served over four years of his attempted murder sentence and was released early from Angola for good behavior. Tex-Mex artist Freddy Fender was pardoned from there.

The song "Grown So Ugly" by American blues musician and ex-convict Robert Pete Williams references Angola. The song's lyrics have some basis in fact, as Williams was imprisoned there and was officially pardoned (from a murder charge) in 1964, the year the song says that he left the prison.

The classic New Orleans song "Junco Partner" includes the lines:

In the Clash's version of "Junco Partner", the lines are a little bit different:

Aaron and Charles Neville wrote "Angola Bound":

Angola also features in the Neville Brothers song "Sons and Daughters" on the album Brother's Keeper.

Folklorist Harry Oster recorded "Angola Prison Worksongs" for his Folklyric Records in 1959, now re-released on Arhoolie Records. According to Oster, between 1929 and 1940, 10,000 floggings were carried out in Angola.

Singer Gil Scott-Heron wrote and recorded the song "Angola, Louisiana" on his 1978 album with Brian Jackson,  Secrets. The song deals with the imprisonment of inmate Gary Tyler.

Canadian blues and roots musician Rita Chiarelli filmed the documentary "Music From the Big House" at Angola in 2010.  The film, directed by Bruce McDonald, focuses on a concert at the prison, organized by Chiarelli, that featured four bands comprising musicians incarcerated in Angola.

Comprising the entire B-Side of his album Remedies, New Orleans musician Dr. John features an extended 17:35 song titled "Angola Anthem".

Singer-songwriter Myshkin recorded "Angola" in 1998 for her album Blue Gold. The song refers to the case of former Angola warden C. Murray Henderson, who was sentenced to 50 years in prison for the attempted murder of his wife, writer Anne Butler:

New Orleans rap artist Juvenile has part of a verse in the Hot Boys song "Dirty World" that says:

New Orleans pianist James Booker mentions Angola prison in his cover of "Goodnight, Irene"; where he was sent for heroin possession:

(As Booker was less than 10 years old when Lead Belly died, they would not have been there at the same time.)

Ray Davies has recorded a song entitled "Angola (Wrong Side of the Law)", which was released as a bonus track on the expanded release of Working Man's Café in February 2008.

The American folk singer David Dondero in the song "20 years" describes the experiences of a prisoner released from Angola prison:

Jazz trumpeter Christian Scott has a track on his 2010 album Yesterday You Said Tomorrow called "Angola, LA & the 13th Amendment"

Texas Country Music artist, Sam Riggs of Sam Riggs and the Night People (Austin, Texas) wrote and recorded a song called "Angola's Lament".  It was released in 2013 on the Outrun the Sun album.

American folk rock duo Indigo Girls reference Angola in the song "The Rise of the Black Messiah" from their 2015 album One Lost Day.

Books about Angola
 In the Place of Justice: A Story of Punishment and Deliverance by Wilbert Rideau (Knopf, 2010)
 Cain's Redemption by Dennis Shere
 Dead Man Walking by Sister Helen Prejean
 God of the Rodeo by Daniel Bergner
 The Search for Hope, Faith, and a Six-Second Ride in Louisiana's Angola Prison – Daniel Bergner – Crown Publishers
 Life Sentences, edited by Wilbert Rideau and Ron Wikberg (Random House, 1992)
 A Life in the Balance: The Billy Wayne Sinclair Story by Billy Wayne Sinclair.
 The prison is referred to in A Confederacy of Dunces by Jones when describing the racial inequality in the New Orleans judicial system.
 The main character of Poppy Z. Brite's novel The Lazarus Heart is sent to Angola for the murder of his lover.
 The House That Herman Built by Herman Wallace of the Angola 3, co-written with artist Jackie Sumell
 An attempt at chemically-induced social control at Angola is a major part of the plot in Walker Percy's novel The Thanatos Syndrome.

Non-fiction books about Angola
 Butler, Anne and C. Murray Henderson, Angola. Dying to Tell (Lafayette, LA: The Center for Louisiana Studies, 1992)
 Butler, Anne and C. Murray Henderson, Angola Louisiana State Penitentiary: A Half-Century of Rage and Reform (Lafayette, LA: The Center for Louisiana Studies, 1990)
Carleton, Mark T., Politics and Punishment: The History of Louisiana State Penal System (Baton Rouge: Louisiana State University Press, 1971)
Foster, Burk, Wilbert Rideau and Douglas Dennis (Editors),  The Wall is Strong: Corrections in Louisiana (Lafayette, LA: The Center for Louisiana Studies, 1995)
Howard, Robert, The other side of the coin: The spiritual life of a black man held captive in Angola prison 40 years (Austin TX:  78764, 2006)
King, Robert Hillary King, From the bottom of the heap:  The autobiography of Black Panther Robert Hillary King (Oakland, CA: PM Press, 2009)
 Mouledous, Joseph Clarence, Sociological Perspectives on a Prison Social System  Unpublished Master's Thesis, (Department of Sociology, Louisiana State University, Baton Rouge, 1962)
Pelot-Hobbs, Lydia "The Contested Terrain of the Louisiana Carceral State" Unpublished Dissertation, (Department of Earth and Environmental Sciences, CUNY Graduate Center, New York City, 2019).
Woodfox, Albert, Solitary: Unbroken by Four Decades in Solitary Confinement. My Story of Transformation and Hope (New York: Grove Press, 2019)

Articles about Angola
 Maya Schenwar, "America's Plantation Prisons", Global Research (August 30, 2008)
 "Witness – Death Behind Bars – Part 1". Al Jazeera
 "Witness – Death Behind Bars – Part 2". Al Jazeera
 Cindy Chang, "Louisiana Is the World's Prison", The Times-Picayune (May 13, 2012)
 Lydia Pelot-Hobbs, "Organized Inside and Out: The Angola Special Civics Project and the Crisis of Mass Incarceration", Souls: A Critical Journal of Black Politics, Culture and Society 15:3 (2013), 199–217.

Other references
Angola was featured in the documentary The Farm: Angola, USA (1998).
Angola Prison was featured in Oliver Stone's movie JFK. The scene where Jim Garrison (Kevin Costner), along with Bill Broussard (Michael Rooker), goes to interview Willie O'Keefe (Kevin Bacon) is portrayed as having taken place at Angola Prison.
Angola Prison was mentioned in the 2007 Coen brothers film No Country for Old Men.
Actor William Hurt prepared for his role in the 2008 remake of The Yellow Handkerchief (2008) by spending four days at the Penitentiary, including an overnight stay, rare for a volunteer, in a maximum-security cell. In a 2010 interview, he spoke of having a three-hour sight-unseen (around the corner of the dividing wall) talk with his next-door neighbor that night. He also said "the bed has about an inch-and-a-half-thick mattress on sheer steel. The toilet has no soft seat. The floor is marbleized concrete. It's horrible. It's unthinkable." He felt mostly sorrow for the inmates he got to know, "85 percent of the people in there are going to die there." In the film, he played an ex-con released after serving a six-year sentence in a Louisiana prison for "an accidental bit of trouble".
In season 6, episode 15 of the TV series Bones, an inmate is threatened with a transfer to Angola should he not cooperate with an investigation.
Sister Prejean's book Dead Man Walking, about prisoners on death row, inspired numerous works, including adaptations as a film, an opera, and a play.
The prison is the central setting for the Animal Planet documentary series Louisiana Lockdown, which debuted in 2012.
The feature film Whiskey Bay (2013), starring Willem Dafoe and Matt Dillon, started shooting in Baton Rouge and at the Angola penitentiary on August 7, 2012.
Angola Prison was mentioned in season one of the TV series True Detective.
The casket for Billy Graham was made by a male inmate, a senior carpenter named Richard, nicknamed "the Grasshopper", who had been convicted for murder, and in residence there 35 years, at Angola.

See also

List of law enforcement agencies in Louisiana
List of United States state correction agencies
Ellen Bryan Moore

References
Schrift, Melissa (Assistant Professor Anthropology, East Tennessee State University). "Angola Prison Art: Captivity, Creativity, and Consumerism." The Journal of American Folklore. Vol. 119, No. 473, Summer, 2006. pp. 257–274. 10.1353/jaf.2006.0035. Available at Jstor; Available at Highbeam Research; Available at Project MUSE.

Footnotes

Further reading
"W. Feliciana's Angola probe may be extended". The Advocate. August 31, 1989.
"Louisiana’s Angola: Proving ground for racialized capitalism". by W.T. Whitney Jr., June 25, 2018.

External links

 Louisiana State Penitentiary
 Louisiana State Penitentiary (Archive)
 Louisiana State Penitentiary (Archive)
 Prison View Golf Course
 Angola Prison Rodeo
 Angola Museum Foundation
 Stein, Joel. "Angola, La.: The Lessons of Cain". TIME. Monday July 10, 2000. Retrieved on January 1, 2010.
 Angola Airstrip: 
"Map from 1858", showing the location of Angola plantation in Louisiana
Andrew Testa photos of the rodeo and death chamber
Angola Museum Oral History Project at The Historic New Orleans Collection
West Feliciana Historical Society Museum
West Feliciana Tourist Commission

 
1901 establishments in Louisiana
Capital punishment in Louisiana
Prisons in Louisiana
Angolan-American history
Buildings and structures in West Feliciana Parish, Louisiana
Women's prisons in Louisiana
Execution sites in the United States
Louisiana populated places on the Mississippi River